The Dream Membrane is a collaborative album by Bill Laswell, David Chaim Smith and John Zorn. It was released on September 30, 2014 by Tzadik Records.

Track listing

Personnel 
Adapted from The Dream Membrane liner notes.
Musicians
Bill Laswell – bass guitar, drone, producer
 David Chaim Smith  – spoken word
John Zorn – alto saxophone, shofar, executive producer
Technical personnel
Heung-Heung Chin – design
James Dellatacoma – engineering
Scott Hull – mastering

Release history

References

External links 
 The Dream Membrane at Discogs (list of releases)

2014 albums
Collaborative albums
Bill Laswell albums
John Zorn albums
Albums produced by Bill Laswell
Tzadik Records albums